Seoul Plaza is a central plaza located in front of Seoul City Hall at Taepyeongno, Jung-gu in Seoul, South Korea. It was reopened on 1 May 2004, by Seoul Metropolitan Government, with the purpose of providing the public an open space. It is part of the city's plans for environmentally friendly renovation projects such as the Cheonggye Stream and Gwanghwamun Plaza.

Description
The site was originally a traffic square with a 40-year-old fountain that was demolished and the nearby space was renovated. Seoul Plaza is elliptical in shape, covering 3,995 pyeong (13,207 m2) in total and 1,904 pyeong (6,294 m2) for grass area. An underground water tank was installed along with 48 lighting around the grass square. The underground tank stores rain water for use in the sprinklers on the lawn.

The plaza has been the site of protests against US beef imports in South Korea, and Korea Queer Culture Festival. The plaza was also the Starting Line of The Amazing Race Australia 4.

Administration
As of 1 June 2011, the Plaza along with Gwanghwamun Plaza are designated as smoke-free zones by the Seoul Metropolitan Government. Smokers are fined  in violation.

Every winter since 2004, the Plaza has hosted an open air ice-rink from mid-December to February the following year, following which are replaced with green lawn and the fountain operational again.

See also
List of parks in Seoul
Seoul City Hall

References

Jung District, Seoul
Squares in Seoul
2004 establishments in South Korea